Vazhukaruteeswarar Temple is a Hindu temple located in the town of Kanchipuram in Tamil Nadu, India. Dedicated to Shiva, the temple is frequented by people praying for success in court cases.

Nearest Hindu Temple
Arulmigu Thirumagaraleeswar Temple, Magaral

References 
 

Hindu temples in Kanchipuram
Shiva temples in Kanchipuram district